Oberes Geiseltal was a Verwaltungsgemeinschaft ("collective municipality") in the Saalekreis district, in Saxony-Anhalt, Germany. It was situated southwest of Halle (Saale). The seat of the Verwaltungsgemeinschaft was in Mücheln. It was disbanded on 1 January 2010.

The Verwaltungsgemeinschaft Oberes Geiseltal consisted of the following municipalities:
 Mücheln
 Oechlitz

Former Verwaltungsgemeinschaften in Saxony-Anhalt